Konstantin Vasilev Kisimov was a Bulgarian stage and film actor born in 1897, deceased in 1965.

He was born in the family of revolutionaries and enlighteners. His father had studied International law in Cambridge University. Naturally Konstantin followed his example and started studying law in the Sofia University and then in the Sorbonne. His love for the stage turned his life. He was admitted to the Acting school of the Ivan Vazov National Theatre and spent there a year before going in on a specialization in Paris in 1924 from where he returned in 1928. At first he was devoted to the theatre, but soon started his career in cinema. He took part in some of the first Bulgarian movies. He went on to become one of the most famous Bulgarian actors until the 1960s. His most notable role was that of Kolcho Slepetsa (Kolcho The Blind) in Pod igoto (1952). Other notable appearances include those in Kalin Orelat (1950), Geroite na Shipka (1955) and Hitar Petar (1960). Konstantin Kisimov died in a car accident in Balchik where he had taken part in a play. A number of Bulgarian theatres and theatrical schools bear his name.

Full filmography

 Privarzaniyat balon (1967) as Slepiyat
 Vyatarnata melnitza (1961) as Dyado Balyu
 Hitar Petar (1960) as Hadzhi Kostaki
 Stublenskite lipi (1960) as Dyado Mishon
 Haydushka kletva (1958) as Yordancho Krastata
 Tochka parva (1956) as Barmaley
 Geroite na Shipka (1955) as Suleiman Pasha
 Pod igoto (1952) as Kolcho slepetza
 Kalin orelat (1950) as Dyado Stoyan
 Izkuplenie (1947) as Stoyan Hadzhigladnev
 Gramada (1936) as Tzeko
 Bezkrustni grobove (1931) as Rangel
 After the Fire Over Russia (1929) as Garbitzata

References

 
 

1897 births
1965 deaths
Bulgarian male film actors
Bulgarian male stage actors
University of Paris alumni
20th-century Bulgarian male actors
People from Veliko Tarnovo
Road incident deaths in Bulgaria